The pétanque competitions at the 2017 Southeast Asian Games in Kuala Lumpur were held at Pudu Ulu Recreational Park.

Medal table

Medalists

Men

Women

Mixed

See also
Boccia at the 2017 ASEAN Para Games
Lawn bowls at the 2017 Southeast Asian Games

References

External links
  

Pétanque at the Southeast Asian Games
2017 Southeast Asian Games events